Elections to Colchester Borough Council were held on 8 May 1986 alongside other local elections across the United Kingdom.

At the election, the Conservative Party lost control of the council to no overall control after having held an overall majority since the 1976 election.

Summary

Ward results

Berechurch

Birch-Messing

Boxted & Langham

Castle

Harbour

Lexden

Mile End

New Town

Prettygate

Shrub End

St. Andrew's

St. Anne's

St. John's

St. Mary's

Stanway

Vote share changes are compared to the top candidate result from the 1984 election.

Tiptree

West Bergholt

West Mersea

Vote share changes are compared to the top candidate result from the 1984 election.

No Independent candidate as previous (-25.5).

Winstree

Wivenhoe

References

1986
1986 English local elections
1980s in Essex